Heinrich LXVII, Prince Reuss Younger Line (20 October 178911 July 1867) was Prince Reuss Younger Line from 1854 to 1867.

Early life
Heinrich LXVII was born at Schleiz, Reuss, younger surviving son of Heinrich XLII, Prince Reuss of Schleiz (1752–1818), (son of Count Heinrich XII Reuss of Schleiz, and Countess Christine of Erbach-Schönberg) and his wife, Princess Caroline of Hohenlohe-Kirchberg (1761–1849), (daughter of Christian Friedrich Karl, Prince of Hohenlohe-Kirchberg and Princess Louise Charlotte of Hohenlohe-Langenburg).

Prince Reuss Younger Line
As his brother Heinrich LXII died unmarried and childless, at his death in 1854 he inherited the throne of the Principality.

Under his government appointed Minister Eduard Heinrich-Crispendorf to make funds in 1856 to amend the constitution in the reactionary sense by the parliament. In 1866 he made a treaty with Kingdom of Prussia in the North German Confederation.

He was considered a man of talent, knowledge and business experience and was very popular in his country.  As a prince he was a close ally of Prussia. He led after the transfer took place in 1848 the residence of Schleiz to Gera in the years 1859 to 1863 and rebuilt the Osterstein Castle.

Prince Heinrich LXVII founded in October 1857 the Golden and Silver Merit, as a "Civil Cross of Honour".

Marriage
Heinrich LXVII married on 18 April 1820 at Ebersdorf to Princess Adelheid Reuss of Ebersdorf (1800–1880), younger daughter of Heinrich LI, Prince Reuss of Ebersdorf, and his wife, Countess Luise of Hoym.

They had eight children:
Prince Heinrich V Reuss of Schleiz (4 December 1821 – 22 October 1861)
Princess Anna Reuss of Schleiz (16 December 1822 – 1 April 1902), married in 1843 to Prince Adolf of Bentheim-Tecklenburg, had issue.
Princess Elisabeth Reuss of Schleiz (8 June 1824 – 17 December 1833)
Prince Heinrich VII Reuss of Schleiz (21 January 1827 – 17 February 1828)
Prince Heinrich XI Reuss of Schleiz (18 November 1828 – 6 March 1830)
Heinrich XIV, Prince Reuss Younger Line (28 May 1832 – 29 March 1913), married in 1858 to Duchess Agnes of Württemberg, had issue.
Prince Heinrich XVI Reuss of Schleiz (2 August 1835 – 4 April 1836)
Princess Marie Reuss of Schleiz (12 April 1837 – 18 May 1840)

Honours 
He received the following orders and decorations:
  Kingdom of Prussia:
 Knight of the Black Eagle
 Iron Cross (1813)
 Knight of the Johanniter Order
 : Knight of St. Hubert, 1810
    Ernestine duchies: Grand Cross of the Saxe-Ernestine House Order, February 1836
 : Grand Cross of the White Falcon, 9 July 1854
 : Knight of the Rue Crown, 1854
 : Grand Cordon of the Order of Leopold (civil), 27 July 1856

Ancestry

References

Europäische Stammtafeln, Band I, Frank Baron Freytag von Loringhoven, 1975, Isenburg, W. K. Prinz von, Reference: Page 170
L'Allemagne dynastique, Huberty, Giraud, Magdelaine, Reference: I 322

1789 births
1854 deaths
People from Schleiz
People from Gera
Princes of Reuss
Recipients of the Iron Cross (1813)